Stately Oaks Plantation is a Greek Revival antebellum mansion located in Margaret Mitchell Memorial Park in Jonesboro, Georgia. Built in 1839, the house was listed on the National Register of Historic Places in 1972.  It is also known as Orr House, The Oaks, and Robert McCord House and it is included in the Jonesboro Historic District.

Stately Oaks is owned by Historical Jonesboro/Clayton County Inc., and features the period house, the home's separate log kitchen, a well house, a tenant house, an 1896 country store, and a one-room schoolhouse.

The house, along with Rural Home, was believed to be the inspiration for Tara, the legendary home of Scarlett O'Hara and her family in Margaret Mitchell's novel Gone with the Wind.

References

External links
Stately Oaks Plantation - Historical Jonesboro

Houses on the National Register of Historic Places in Georgia (U.S. state)
Houses completed in 1839
Plantation houses in Georgia (U.S. state)
Historic house museums in Georgia (U.S. state)
Museums in Clayton County, Georgia
Greek Revival houses in Georgia (U.S. state)
Colonial Revival architecture in Georgia (U.S. state)
Antebellum architecture
Houses in Clayton County, Georgia
National Register of Historic Places in Clayton County, Georgia